Anniedelle is an unincorporated community in Floyd County, in the U.S. state of Georgia.

History
A post office was established at Anniedelle in 1893, and remained in operation until it was discontinued in 1901. The community was named in honor of Sadayi a.k.a. "Annie Ax", a local Cherokee woman. A variant spelling was "Anniedell".

References

Unincorporated communities in Floyd County, Georgia
Unincorporated communities in Georgia (U.S. state)